Carolyn Relf is a Canadian geologist. She has served as director of the Yukon Geological Survey (since January 2008), project geologist with the Government of the Northwest Territories, chief geologist with Indigenous and Northern Affairs Canada, federal co-manager of the Northwest Territories' Geoscience Office, director of the Mineral and Petroleum Resources for Indian and Northern Affairs Canada, as well as adjunct professor at the University of Alberta.

Career 
Relf's early career life began in Yellowknife, North West Territories, in 1981. She initially started out in working as a surveying geologist. There were other women in the field, however she was the only female on her specific crew. Through networking, Relf eventually landed a role as the Director of Yukon Geological Surveying. She is currently still in this role, and supports a number of other surveyors within her department.

Throughout her time in Yellowknife, Relf attended a conference with several of her University of Queens peers within the surveying industry, in which offered training and preparation for future careers in geology. For Relf, this type of hands on experience was invaluable, and one of the most effective ways to gain knowledge of geology, based on her own personal experiences. Through their many successful field expeditions, Relf's team acquired recognition from the federal government of Canada, and received grant funding for developing university curriculum in the field of geological science. This brought Relf to Edmonton, as the University of Alberta was often a jumping off point for geological workings in the Yukon, being that it is the closest metropolis city to Yellowknife. The University of Alberta had a large stake in the geological projects occurring in Yellowknife and much of its research on campus was based on the field of the North West Territory.

The U of A was looking to broaden its scope on research and geological analysis, so they reached out to Relf's team to bring their field work within the NWT to the University for the purpose of better educating students on geological survey methods. Every fall, Relf's team would bring 4-6 chosen students to join them in their field surveys, to produce geological maps of areas within the NWT. Teaching became a passion of Relf's, and her fieldwork with university students became her legacy. She did her last year of field training in 2007, after 7 years of teaching at the U of A.

Although Relf was often in a minority role, as a female within the field of geology, she affirms that over the course of the 7 graduating classes that she taught throughout her time at the University of Alberta, all of which were an even distribution of men and women. Relf does not believe the field of geology to be male dominated, from her own personal experience, however international fields do tend to have more male dominance in leads of international expeditions. Considering the strenuous 3–4 months field expeditions, it's a wonder there are as many women in the field as there are.

At the height of her career, Relf currently has an even mapping crew of 3-3 male to female geologists. Her survey crew is actually 3-1 female dominated, and her mineral crew is 4-1 male dominated, a fairly even distribution overall.

Education 
Relf's high school teacher John Reid, a working geologist, was her first memory of exposure to the field of geology. Reid took Relf's entire high school class on a 5-day geological field trip, which inspired her to pursue further education in the field of Geology.

When Relf graduated high school, she moved from Mississauga, Ontario to Kingston, Ontario to attend (Queen's University, 1984). She did her undergrad degree in Geology and would later do her masters in Newfoundland, a master's degree in geochemistry and mineral chemistry (Memorial University of Newfoundland, 1988), and a Ph.D. in structural geology, metamorphic petrology, and Archean tectonics (Queen's University, 1992). also in the field of geology. Upon graduation, Relf returned to Kingston to embark on a new career with the NATMAP organization (a national mapping organization). Within this organization, she was offered the opportunity to further her education, and began pursuing a PhD at the Queens University.

Personal life 
Dr. Caroyln Relf grew up in the suburbs of Mississauga, Ontario with 3 other siblings (David, Heather and Robert). Her father was a high school science teacher, having obtained his degree in chemistry. Relf is married to a geologist; they have a daughter.

References

Living people
Canadian geologists
Canadian women geologists
20th-century Canadian women scientists
21st-century Canadian women scientists
Academic staff of the University of Alberta
Queen's University at Kingston alumni
Memorial University of Newfoundland alumni
Year of birth missing (living people)